Bus-Obo is a  high cinder cone in Mongolia. It may be of Pleistocene or Holocene age.

It is located within a Caledonian orogenic belt in Mongolia, in the Middle Gobi area. A low velocity zone in the mantle is associated with Bus-Obo. Other Pliocene to Pleistocene age lava flows and craters are found within the adjacent Orchon valley, their relationship to this cone is unknown.

References 

Volcanoes of Mongolia
Cinder cones
Pleistocene volcanism
Holocene volcanism